This is a listing of the horses that finished in either first, second, or third place and the number of starters in the All Brandy Stakes, an American Thoroughbred Stakes race for fillies and mares three years old and up at one and one eighth miles (9 furlongs) run on turf at Laurel Park Racecourse in Laurel, Maryland.

References

 Thoroughbred Database, Stakes Races; 

Laurel Park Racecourse